Cosmic Funk is an album by keyboardist Lonnie Liston Smith, featuring performances recorded in 1974 and released by the Flying Dutchman label.

Jason Heller, in Strange Stars: How Science Fiction and Fantasy Transformed Popular Music, pointed to the title track as an example of "sci-fi funk."

Reception

In his review for AllMusic, Stephen Thomas Erlewine stated, "it's a record where the good ideas are sometimes suggested rather than developed.  ... That opening song is one of the few tracks that emphasizes funk, otherwise the cosmic reigns, as the group usually getting spacy all the while never quite leaving the earth.  ... the album is distinguished by the spaces that lie between funk and bop, the periods where Smith and company start to float, then pull themselves back."

Record Collector called the album "funky spiritual jazz."

Track listing
All compositions by Lonnie Liston Smith except where noted
 "Cosmic Funk" − 5:35
 "Footprints" (Wayne Shorter) − 6:08
 "Beautiful Woman" − 6:57
 "Sais (Egypt)" (James Mtume) − 8:15
 "Peaceful Ones" − 5:03
 "Naima" (John Coltrane) − 4:02

Personnel
Lonnie Liston Smith − piano, electric piano, percussion
Donald Smith − vocals, flute, piano
George Barron − soprano saxophone, flute, percussion
Al Anderson − electric bass
Art Gore − drums
Lawrence Killian − congas, percussion
Andrew Cyrille, Doug Hammond, Ron Bridgewater − percussion

References

1974 albums
Albums produced by Bob Thiele
Flying Dutchman Records albums
RCA Records albums
Jazz-funk albums
Lonnie Liston Smith albums